Chahar Murun may refer to:
 Chahar Murun-e Jowkar
 Chahar Murun-e Tamdari